Ko Kut, also known as Koh Kood, is an island in the Gulf of Thailand. The island is administrated as part of the Ko Kut District in Thailand's Trat Province.

Description 
Ko Kut is located in the eastern Gulf of Thailand. The island is the largest of the dozen islands administrated as part of the Ko Kut District. The economy of Ko Kut is centered around fishing, agriculture, and tourism. Some sources have described the island as being relatively remote and underdeveloped. The island's remoteness and lack of development make it a potential hub for ecotourism.

References 

Islands of Thailand
Geography of Trat province
Islands of the Gulf of Thailand